The 113th Cavalry Regiment is a cavalry regiment of the Iowa National Guard, with history tracing back to the 19th century Indian Wars.

It was heavily involved in fighting during World War II against German forces in France, Belgium, the Netherlands, and Germany from June 1944 to May 1945. Following a long period of inactivation after World War II, one squadron of the 113th Cavalry was reactivated in 1992. Since being reactivated, the 1st Squadron of the 113th Cavalry Regiment (part of the 2nd Brigade Combat Team, 34th Infantry Division) has conducted peace keeping operations in Kosovo, as well as combat deployments during Operation Iraqi Freedom, and Operation Enduring Freedom.

History 
Iowa had organized the 1st Cavalry Squadron in 1915, a unit with four troops (companies) and which had seen service on the Mexican frontier during the pursuit of Pancho Villa. During World War I, the squadron was split up; Troop A became the division headquarters troop for the 34th Division, Troop B was reorganized as part of the 125th Machine Gun Battalion, 34th Division, Troop C was reorganized as part of the 133rd Infantry Regiment, 34th Division, Troop D was reorganized as part of the 109th Ammunition Train, 34th Division, and the band was reorganized as part of the 301st Cavalry Regiment. The 34th Division shipped to France in late 1918, but did not see any combat, and the 301st Cavalry Regiment was converted to field artillery units in the summer of 1918, but none of these units shipped overseas before the end of the war.

After World War I, the 113th Cavalry was constituted in 1921 as part of the Iowa National Guard and subordinated to the 24th Cavalry Division. The regiment participated in riot control duties during the Cow War in Iowa in 1931, and elements of the regiment suppressed labor unrest in Newton, Iowa, in 1938. The regiment was relieved from assignment to the 24th Cavalry Division in September 1940, inducted into federal service on 13 January 1941, and moved to Camp Bowie, Texas, on 25 January 1941.

The 113th Cavalry Regiment (Horse-Mechanized) sailed to England, arriving on 28 January 1944. In England, the regiment was converted to the 113th Cavalry Group (Mechanized), with the 1st Squadron becoming the 113th Cavalry Squadron (Mechanized) and the 2nd Squadron becoming the 125th Cavalry Squadron (Mechanized). Under the combat group concept, even though the two squadrons were only "attached" to the 113th Cavalry Group headquarters as opposed to permanently "assigned" and could be attached and detached at will as the tactical situation warranted, they served as essentially organic elements of the 113th Cavalry Group. Subsequently, the 113th Cavalry Group served as the XIX Corps' mechanized cavalry group, fighting in Normandy, the Netherlands and the conquest of Germany. The 113th Cavalry Group returned to the New York port of entry on 25 October 1945 and was inactivated at Camp Shanks, New York, on 26 October 1945.

The 1st Squadron, 113th Cavalry was reactivated on 11 September 1992, at ceremonies at Camp Dodge, Iowa, from former elements of the 194th Cavalry. In 1996 the squadron was restructured for the next ten years with the Headquarters and Headquarters Troop (HHT) at Sioux City, Iowa, Troops A and B at Camp Dodge, Troop C at Le Mars, and Troops D, E and later Troop F at Waterloo. With the next reorganization, Troops D, E and F were detached when the 1-113th Cavalry reorganized into a RSTA (Cavalry) and became an organic asset to the 2d Brigade Combat Team, 34th Infantry Division. It remains an active duty unit of the Iowa National Guard.

There are three troops that comprise the 1-113th Cavalry and one support unit along with a Headquarters Troop. Troops A and B drill at Camp Dodge, Iowa, and Troop C is headquartered in Le Mars, Iowa. The support unit, Company D, 334th Brigade Support Battalion (BSB), trains in Sioux City, along with the HHT, as well as a detachment from 2168th Transportation Company (TC). Troop C returned from Iraq in October 2006. Troop A deployed in June 2007, and the squadron as a whole, including Company D, 334th BSB, and the 2168th Transportation Company, deployed in November 2010 with the 2d Brigade Combat Team as part of Operation Enduring Freedom.

Awards and decorations

Campaign credit

Unit Decorations

See also 
 24th Cavalry Division (United States)
 List of armored and cavalry regiments of the United States Army

References 

113
Military units and formations in Iowa
Military units and formations established in 1921
1921 establishments in the United States